is a corporation headquartered in Tokyo, Japan. JFE is from Japan, Fe (the chemical element symbol of iron) and Engineering. In 2020, it is ranked 365th in Fortune Global 500 List.

Mergers and Spinoffs
At the time JFE Holdings was created in 2002, NKK Corporation was Japan's second largest steelmaker and Kawasaki Steel was the third largest steelmaker.
Both companies were major military vessel manufacturers during World War II.

JFE's main business is steel production. It also engages in engineering, ship building, real-estate redevelopment, and LSi business. The company also operates several overseas subsidiaries, including California Steel Industries in the United States, Fujian Sino-Japan Metal in China, and Minas da Serra Geral in Brazil.  Other than steel, they are also known for products such as the bicycle tree.

JFE Holdings owns JFE Steel, the fifth largest steel maker in the world with revenue in excess of US$30 billion. JFE Holdings has other subsidiaries including JFE Engineering, JFE Steel and JFE Shoji, and part-owns Japan Marine United, a major shipbuilding company.

NKK and Siderca S.A. of Argentina established a seamless pipe joint venture by spinning off the seamless pipe division of NKK's Keihin Works in 2000. In November 2009, JFE agreed to partner with JSW Steel, India's third-largest steel producer, to construct a joint steel plant in West Bengal. In July 2010, JFE acquired a 14.9% stake in India's JSW Steel Ltd.

Its shipbuilding unit, Universal Shipbuilding was created in 2002 when NKK Corporation a predecessor of JFE, merged its shipbuilding unit with that of Hitachi Zosen. In 2012, JFE merged its ship building unit, Universal Shipbuilding Corporation, with Marine United Inc. of IHI after discussion started in April 2008 to form Japan Marine United Corporation It aimed to become Japan's largest shipbuilder. However, on January 1, 2021, JMU (with 49% of shares) merged into a new joint venture with Imabari Shipbuilding (with 51% of shares) named Nihon Shipyard and covering all ship types except LNG tankers. In parallel, Imabari Shipbuilding bought 30% of JMU's shares. The cooperation between Imabari Shipbuilding and JMU make it one of the largest marine engineering and shipbuilding company in the world.

Products

Super-rapid charging
JFE Engineering Corporation is developing a quick charging station that it claims can take a battery from zero charge to 50% full in about 3 minutes. It has two batteries, one that stores electrical energy from the grid and another that delivers it to the car at extremely high current (500-600 ampere), which allows it to use a low voltage power supply. The company claims that even though one station costs about $63,000, that's roughly 40% less than the competing CHAdeMO system.

Bicycle Tree
The bicycle tree is an automatic storage system for bicycles that can hold up to 6,000 bikes. The systems works by fitting the bicycle with an electronic tag and a computer saves the owner's data. Then a mechanical arm pulls the bike into a cylindrical well and stores it in a free location. When the owner wants to retrieve the bike, a card is swiped through a reader and the computer retrieves the bike based on the data.

Carbon footprint
JFE Holdings, Inc. reported Total CO2e emissions (Direct + Indirect) for the twelve months ending 31 March 2019 at 60,500 Kt (+600/+1% y-o-y). There have been no significant reductions in recent years.

References

External links
JFE Holdings, Inc. (English)
JFE Steel Corporation (English)
JFE Engineering Corporation (English)

Steel companies of Japan
Manufacturing companies based in Tokyo
Holding companies based in Tokyo
Electrical engineering companies of Japan
Electrical wiring and construction supplies manufacturers
Wind turbine manufacturers
Shipbuilding companies of Japan
Defense companies of Japan
Companies listed on the Tokyo Stock Exchange
Manufacturing companies established in 2002
Holding companies established in 2002
Japanese companies established in 2002
Fuyo Group
Japanese brands
Wind power in Japan